Earl Alfred Jinkinson (September 26, 1905 – November 30, 1995 in Tryon, North Carolina) was an American antitrust lawyer.

Biography
Jinkinson received his law degree from Stetson University, after which he became an FBI agent in 1941. He worked for the United States Department of Justice (DOJ) as chief of their antitrust division in Jacksonville, Florida from 1948 to 1952, whereupon he began working at their Chicago division. He later became the chief of this anti-trust division. While in charge of the DOJ's Chicago antitrust office, he led cases against Seeburg Corporation and the Kansas City Star. He later joined Winston & Strawn, where he went on to become a senior partner. While there, he handled antitrust cases including one involving the Milwaukee Braves, in which he served as lead counsel. He retired from Winston & Strawn in 1988.

Personal life
Jinkinson was married to Virginia Jinkinson (née Watson) until his death in 1995. They had two daughters: Georgia Bonesteel and Jill Moore.

References

1905 births
1995 deaths
Antitrust lawyers
20th-century American lawyers
Stetson University alumni
United States Department of Justice lawyers
People from Tryon, North Carolina
People associated with Winston & Strawn